Ute Dix (born 10 September 1955) is a German speed skater. She competed in two events at the 1976 Winter Olympics.

References

1955 births
Living people
German female speed skaters
Olympic speed skaters of East Germany
Speed skaters at the 1976 Winter Olympics
Sportspeople from Saxony